General elections were held in Dominica on 1 July 1985. The result was a victory for the Dominica Freedom Party, which won 15 of the 21 seats. Voter turnout was 74.6%.

Results

References

Dominica
Elections in Dominica
1985 in Dominica
July 1985 events in North America